Gustav Adolf von Deines (10 March 1852 – 30 May 1914), born Gustav Adolf Deines, was a Prussian military officer, a General of the Artillery, a member of the German General Staff and  of the Prussian army.

Life

Early life
Gustav Adolf Deines was born in Hanau, to a junior branch of a long-established landowning family. His father, Konrad Otto Deines (1824–1886), a landowner, horticulturalist, landscape gardener and business leader who ran a successful plant nursery in Hanau. His mother was Friederike Karoline (née Textor; 1827–1885). Deines' early education took place at the Hohe Landesschule in Hanau, but he did not attend university, and was conscripted directly into military service upon graduating.

Military career
On 29 March 1870, Deines was assigned to the 8th (1st Rhenish) Field Artillery (von Holtzendorff) Regiment as part of the XXI Army Corps in Saarlouis, with which he would serve for the entirety of the Franco-Prussian War. In the Spring of the following year, Deines was appointed to the German General Staff, where he served until 1883, when he was made Adjutant of the  2nd Foot Artillery Brigade. In this position, he was able to draw upon the experience he gained during the siege of Paris, and published  (The Activity of the Siege Artillery Before Paris in the War of 1870/71) to great acclaim, for the first time bringing much deserved recognition to the artillerymen who made the siege successful and helped the German forces win the war. Kaiser Wilhelm II raised Deines to the untitled hereditary nobility on 18 October 1910, after which he became known as Gustav Adolf .

Family
Gustav Adolf von Deines was the second cousin of the Prussian Cavalry General Adolf von Deines, with whom he shared not only a similarity in name, but also in career. Both men were heavily involved in the German General Staff during the 1880s and 1890s. In addition, they were both intimates of Graf Alfred von Schlieffen. One distinct difference was their right to the surname . The elder von Deines inherited his nobiliary particle from his grandfather, who was ennobled in 1847, while the younger was ennobled in his own right by the Kaiser in 1910. 

In 1888, Deines married Ida Clara (née Poppe; 1862–1939), and they had four children, two sons and two daughters:
Ortwin Adolf (24 June 1889 - 14 March 1935)
Echart Otto Oskar (1892 - 1967)
Karoline Antonie Helga (1896 - 1938)
Helga Elisabeth Johanna (16 July 1898 - 17 May 1958) married Lutz Heck, director of the Berlin Zoological Garden.

Awards and decorations
German orders:
 Knight of the Order of the Red Eagle, Second Class with Oak Leaves, January 1909 (Prussia)
 Knight of the Royal Order of the Crown, Second Class (Prussia)
 Military Merit Cross (Prussia)
 Knight Commander of the Military Merit Order, Second Class with Star, 1910, First Class, 21 February 1911 (Bavaria)
 Commander of the Albert Order, Commander's Cross, 1900 (Saxony)
 Commander of the Order of the Württemberg Crown, with Star (Württemberg)
Foreign orders:
 Order of the Sacred Treasure, Fourth Class (Japan)
 Grand Officer of the Order of the Crown of Italy (Italy)
 Knight of the Order of the Iron Crown, Second Class (Austria-Hungary)
 Grand Cross of Order of the Star of Romania (Romania)

Works published

Further reading

References 

1852 births
1914 deaths
19th-century German people
Generals of Artillery (Prussia)
German military personnel of the Franco-Prussian War
German untitled nobility
People from Hanau
People from the Kingdom of Prussia
Quartermasters
Recipients of the Order of the Crown (Italy)
Recipients of the Order of the Sacred Treasure, 4th class
Crosses of Military Merit
Military personnel from Hesse